Nsele or N'Sele is a municipality (commune) in the Tshangu district of Kinshasa, the capital city of the Democratic Republic of the Congo.

It is situated in the east of Kinshasa, on the Pool Malebo. Nsele is a primarily rural commune, just like its neighbour Maluku on the other bank of the river Nsele River.

Demographics

References 

Communes of Kinshasa
Tshangu District